Passchendaele is a 2008 Canadian war film, written, co-produced, directed by, and starring Paul Gross. The film, which was shot in Calgary, Alberta, Fort Macleod, Alberta, and in Belgium, focuses on the experiences of a Canadian soldier, Michael Dunne, at the Battle of Passchendaele, also known as the Third Battle of Ypres, inspired by stories that Gross heard from his grandfather, a First World War soldier.

The film had its premiere at the 2008 Toronto International Film Festival on September 4, 2008, when it also had the honour of opening the festival. The film received a mixed reception upon release. On March 2, 2009, Paul Gross was honoured for his film Passchendaele, winning that year's National Arts Centre Award for achievement over the past performance year. The film won five awards the 29th Genie Awards, including Best Picture, and also received the Golden Reel Award for Canada's top-grossing film of 2008.

Plot
In the spring of 1917 after Vimy Ridge, Sergeant Michael Dunne of the 10th Battalion, CEF survives heavy combat but suffers from neurasthenia. He is sent home for recovery as a war hero for taking out a German machine gun position. While in hospital in Calgary, Alberta, where he had originally enlisted, he meets nurse Sarah Mann (Caroline Dhavernas).

David Mann (Joe Dinicol) is Sarah's younger brother, ineligible for military service due to asthma but determined to enlist. The Manns are ostracized when it becomes known their father died at Vimy Ridge fighting for the Imperial German Army.

The father of David's girlfriend pulls strings to allow him to enlist. Dunne feels responsible for David's wellbeing and reenlists as a private under his mother's maiden name McCrae. He promised Sarah to protect her brother.

David and Michael end up in the battlefields of Belgium fighting for their lives. Sarah also enlists and follows the 10th as a nurse in triage at an Advanced Dressing Station near the front. The three arrive in Flanders in time for the Battle of Passchendaele. Dunne and Sarah soon meet up again when Dunne brings a wounded man to the aid station. Dunne's cover as McCrae is soon blown, he manages to escape punishment and is promoted to platoon leader by Lieutenant Colonel Ormond, who knew him from earlier combat, when his past actions "should have got a V.C." and because of the need for experienced soldiers as high casualties were expected.

When the Canadians launch their attack, the 8th Battalion (90th Winnipeg Rifles), CEF, known as the Little Black Devils, faces a German counter-attack and become pinned down and fight to complete exhaustion. Dunne's company is sent to support them. After the support company arrives, the 8th Battalion begins to withdraw from the battlefield, believing that they are finally relieved, leaving the job of holding the ground to Dunne's small force. As the reality of the war begins to set in, David Mann begins to realize the war was not what he believed it would be. Dunne's forces spend the night in their trenches, and as a result of the shelling, David begins to have an asthmatic/panic attack and Dunne calms him down, relieving the problem.

The next morning the Germans counter-attack, and make it as far as the line, and both forces attack each other in close quarters combat. As the Germans retreat, David breaks down and chases them back to surrender. He jumps into their trenches and is met by a gun to the face where he begs in German. He is about to be shot when an artillery shell lands and the explosion throws him onto what is effectively a cross, created by walkway timbers from the trench. He is visually crucified by the explosion. This relates to Dunne's earlier story of the legendary report of the crucified soldier. When Dunne sees this he takes his helmet off, throws his gun down and runs to David, in a reckless attempt to keep his promise to keep him alive, getting shot in the process. He crawls to the cross on his knees, looking up at it. The Germans stop firing and allow him to retrieve David, whom he carries back to his own lines. The fighting swiftly resumes with a shell landing. David lives, but Dunne is carried to the hospital where he dies after his last words with Sarah. This happens just as the news comes in that the Canadians have captured Passchendaele Ridge.

The ending scene shows David Mann, who now has only one leg and uses a wheelchair; Sarah Mann; David's girlfriend Cassie; Highway and Dunne's best friend Royster (Gil Bellows) paying tribute at Dunne's grave on his home farm. The marker has been altered to remove the "5" of 1915 and changed to 1917. The camera then pans out and the background alters to a field of hundreds of Canadian war graves with a riderless horse on the horizon.

Cast

Production
Production on the film reportedly began on August 20, 2007, with principal photography in Calgary, Alberta. The film was shot over a period of forty-five days and involved over 200 actors, some of them Canadian Forces soldiers with combat experience in Afghanistan. Battle scenes were filmed on the Tsuu T'ina Indian reserve just outside Calgary, and principal photography finished in October 2007. The film was edited by David Wharnsby, and its score composed by Jan A.P. Kaczmarek.

Inspiration
This film was inspired by Gross's relationship with his maternal grandfather, Michael Joseph Dunne, who served in the 56th, 5th, 14th and 23rd Reserve Battalions, CEF, in the First World War. Like many veterans, he was reticent about sharing his experiences with his family. In a rare conversation on a fishing trip, Dunne told the story of bayonetting a young German soldier, who had eyes like water, through the head and killing him during a battle. A long time later, as Dunne lay in a hospital bed in the last days of his life, his family was mystified by Dunne's behaviour of asking for forgiveness, over and over. Only Gross knew that he was speaking to the young German he had killed.
"He went completely out of his mind at the end. He started telling me about a hideous event that happened during a skirmish in a little ruined town in World War I. He'd killed someone in a miserable, horrible way and that had obviously haunted him throughout the rest of his life. As my grandfather died, in his mind he was back in that town, trying to find a German boy whom he'd bayonetted in the forehead. He'd lived with that memory all his life – and he was of a time when people kept things to themselves. When he finally told the story, it really affected me and I've not been able to get it out of my head."

During the early portion of the film, the scene is recreated in a broken church, when Sergeant Michael Dunne bayonets a young German soldier through the forehead.

Funding
In November 2005, the Government of Alberta announced a $5.5-million grant to Gross and the film project as part of Alberta's centennial; the overall budget has been announced at between $16 million and $20 million, making it the highest-budgeted Canadian-produced film ever. The film was publicly announced at a news conference at the Museum of the Regiments on November 13, 2005.

"The province's centennial is a time to recognize our past and tell our stories, including those about Alberta's military heritage. We must work to keep our veterans' sacrifices in the forefront of our minds. The story of Passchendaele pays tribute to a key event in our country's history, and will educate Albertans and all Canadians for years to come." – Premier Ralph Klein

Historical background
 The 10th Battalion was originally formed from Albertans, Saskatchewanians and Manitobans, though as the war progressed it became identified solely as an Alberta battalion. The "Fighting Tenth" served with the 1st Canadian Division and participated in all major Canadian battles of the war, and set the record for highest number of individual bravery awards for a single battle. At Hill 70, sixty men were awarded the Military Medal for the fighting there, in addition to a Victoria Cross, three Distinguished Service Orders, seven Military Crosses, and nine Distinguished Conduct Medals.

"Named for a village located on a low rise in the Ypres Salient, the very word Passchendaele has become synonymous with suffering and waste. Strong German defences in this area, developed over the course of more than two years, gave the British extremely hard going.

"The Tenth Battalion were called out of reserve to assist an attack on Hill 52, part of the same low rise Passchendaele itself was situated on. The Battalion was not scheduled to attack, but the CO wisely prepared his soldiers as if they would be making the main assault – a decision that paid dividends when the unit was called out of reserve. On 10 November 1917, the Tenth Battalion took the feature with light casualties."

Accuracy
The battle scene at the end of the movie depicts a relief of the 8th Battalion, CEF (known by their nickname "The Little Black Devils") by the 10th Battalion, an action that actually happened, as described by the history of the 10th Battalion:

Lieutenant Colonel Ormond, the Commanding Officer of the 10th (also a character in the film) gave a handwritten account of the relief in which he said:

Reception
Passchendaele received mixed or poor reviews from critics. As of April 8, 2022, the review aggregator Rotten Tomatoes reported that 40% of critics gave the film a positive review, with an average score of 5 out of 10, based on 15 reviews.

Box office
The film was a commercial failure as it went on to gross only $4,452,423, well under its $20 million budget.

Awards
On March 2, 2009, Paul Gross was honoured for his film Passchendaele, winning that year's National Arts Centre Award for achievement over the past performance year.

At the 29th Genie Awards, the film won the Achievement in Art Direction/Production Design, Achievement in Costume Design, Achievement in Overall Sound, Achievement in Sound Editing, and Best Picture. It also received the Golden Reel Award for Canada's top-grossing film of 2008.

References

External links

2008 films
2008 drama films
2000s historical films
2000s war films
Anti-war films about World War I
Canadian Armed Forces in films
Canadian war drama films
English-language Canadian films
Films about veterans
Films directed by Paul Gross
Films scored by Jan A. P. Kaczmarek
Films set in 1917
Films set in Calgary
Films set in Belgium
Films shot in Belgium
Films shot in Calgary
Best Picture Genie and Canadian Screen Award winners
War romance films
Western Front (World War I) films
World War I films based on actual events
Battle of Passchendaele
Canadian epic films
Calgary Highlanders
2000s English-language films
Canadian World War I films
2000s Canadian films